Lawrence Buildings in Mount Street, Manchester, England, is a Victorian office block constructed for the Inland Revenue in 1874–6 by Pennington and Bridgen in the Gothic Revival style. It is a Grade II* listed building as of 3 October 1974.

The building is of sandstone ashlar with a slate roof. Its skyline is dramatic, with "tourelles and slated spirelet, tall crocketed gable(s), low dormers and tall chimmneys". Heavily decorated, it displays a statue of Queen Victoria beneath a canopy on the central front, together with a doorcase flanked by "a lion and a unicorn on pedestals, with an elaborate two-storey oriel window above".

Lawrence Buildings forms a group with St Andrew's Chambers, to the right, in a similar style.

The ground floor is a cafe, and the remaining building, floors 1-5 are occupied by flexible office space company, incspaces.

See also

Grade II* listed buildings in Greater Manchester
Listed buildings in Manchester-M2

Notes

References

Grade II* listed buildings in Manchester
Office buildings completed in 1876
Gothic Revival architecture in Greater Manchester
Sandstone buildings